Watkins House is a historic home located at 302 South Camden Street, Richmond, Ray County, Missouri.  It was designed by architect George F. Barber and built about 1890.  It is a -story, Queen Anne style frame dwelling sheathed in five different types of shingles.  It features an encircling porch connected with a turreted hexagonal corner tower; a projecting attic gable with a recessed porch; a pedimented and projecting dormer; carved wood panels; and a chimney with ornate terra cotta panels.

It was added to the National Register of Historic Places in 1983.

See also
List of George Franklin Barber works

References

Houses on the National Register of Historic Places in Missouri
Queen Anne architecture in Missouri
Houses completed in 1890
1890s architecture in the United States
Houses in Ray County, Missouri
National Register of Historic Places in Ray County, Missouri